33rd Waffen Cavalry Division of the SS (3rd Hungarian) was formed from Hungarian volunteers, in December 1944.

It never had more than one regiment when it was absorbed by the 26th Waffen Grenadier Division of the SS (2nd Hungarian) the following month, after it was almost destroyed in the fighting near Budapest.

There is also some doubt that there ever was a 33rd Waffen Cavalry Division of the SS (3rd Hungarian) in anything but name.

The number 33 was re-issued and given to the Charlemagne Division.

References

Footnotes

Bibliography

Cavalry divisions of the Waffen-SS
Foreign volunteer units of the Waffen-SS
Military units and formations established in 1944
Military units and formations disestablished in 1945